The Bayer designation Xi Ceti (ξ Cet / ξ Ceti) is shared by two star systems, in the constellation Cetus:
ξ1 Ceti
ξ2 Ceti

All of them were member of asterism 天囷 (Tiān Qūn), Circular Celestial Granary, Stomach mansion.

References

Ceti, Xi
Cetus (constellation)